The International Piano Competition "Ricard Viñes" takes part each year in Auditorium Enric Granados in Lleida (Spain).

Prize winners (Category A)
1st Competition, 1995
1st prize – Lluís Rodríguez Salvà (Girona Catalunya)
2nd prize – Pierre-Marie Van Caenegem (Almeria Andalucia)
3rd prize – José Menor Martín  (Sabadell Catalunya)
2nd Competition, 1996
1st prize – José Menor Martín (Sabadell Catalunya)
2nd prize – Ricardo Martínez Descalzo (Alacant Comunitat Valenciana)
3rd prize – Mervin Fernández Piedra (Cuba)
3rd Competition, 1997
1st prize – Mariona Vicens Cuyàs (Girona Catalunya)
2nd prize – Pedro Valero Abril (Molina De Segura Múrcia)
3rd prize – Ricardo Martínez Descalzo (Alacant Comunitat Valenciana)
4th Competition, 1998
1st prize – Ricardo Martínez Descalzo (Alacant Comunitat Valenciana)
2nd prize – Àlex Maynegre Torra (Barcelona Catalunya)
3rd prize – none
5th Competition, 1999
1st prize – Luís Aracama Gardoqui ( Santander Cantabria)
2nd prize – Emílio González Sanz (Burgos Castilla – León)
3rd prize – Gustavo Andrés Peláez (L'hospitalet De Llobregat Catalunya)
6th Competition, 2000
1st prize – Emilio González Sanz (Burgos Castilla – León)
2nd prize – Pedro Pardo Bañeres (Lleida Catalunya)
3rd prize – Raimon Garriga Moreno ( Barcelona Catalunya)
7th Competition, 2001
1st prize – Carmen Yepes Martín (Míeres Astúrias)
2nd prize – Josu De Solaun Soto (València Comunitat Valenciana)
3rd prize – Àlex Alguacil Ruiz (Barcelona Catalunya)
8th Competition, 2002
1st prize – Alex Alguacil Ruiz (Santa Coloma Cataluña)
2nd prize – Jordi Farran Lapeña (Lleida Cataluña)
3rd prize – none
9th Competition, 2003
1st prize – Jordi Farran Lapeña – Lleida (Spain)
2nd prize – Enrique Bernaldo De Quirós Martín – Madrid (Spain)
3rd prize – Alfonso Gómez Ruiz De Arcaute – Vitoria-Gasteiz (Spain)
10th Competition, 2004
1st prize – Christopher Devine – Wassenaar (Netherlands)
2nd prize – Miguel Angel Castro Martín – Sta Cruz Tenerife (Spain)
3rd prize – José Enrique Bagaria Villazán – Barcelona (Spain)
11th Competition, 2005
1st prize – Luís Parés (Italy)
2nd prize – Emmanuelle Swiercz (France)
3rd prize – Natalia Posnova (Russia)
12th Competition, 2006
1st prize – none
2nd prize – Enrique De Bernaldo Quirós and Eduardo Fernández Garcia
3rd prize – none
13th Competition, 2007
1st prize – Josep García Martínez
2nd prize – Alexander Yakovlev
3rd prize – Carlos Guerrero Bullejos
14th Competition, 2008
1st prize – Bruno Vlahek
2nd prize – Olga Kozlova
3rd prize – Enrique Bernaldo De Quirós
15th Competition, 2009
1st prize – Eugeny Starodubtsev
2nd prize – Scipione Sangiovanni
3rd prize – Jingjing Wang
16th Competition, 2010
1st prize – Daniil Tsvetkov
2nd prize – Aljosa Jurinic
3rd prize – Tatiana Bezmenova
17th Competition, 2011
1st prize – Jackie Jaekyung Yoo
2nd prize – Zoltán Fejérvári
3rd prize – Sun-A Park
18th Competition, 2012
1st prize – Regina Chernychko
2nd prize – Yuka Beppu
3rd prize – Stephanie Proot
19th Competition, 2013
1st prize – Natalia Sokolovskaya
2nd prize – Denis Zhdanov
3rd prize – Kiryl Keduk
20th Competition, 2014
1st prize — SHIGENO Tomoka
2nd prize — ZHDANOV Denis
3st prize — VOLOV Nikita
21st Competition, 2015
1st prize — ZIMING Ren
2nd prize — SATO Hiroo
3st prize — RUMYANTSEV Vladimir
22nd Competition, 2016
1st prize — LAPAZ Enrique
2nd prize — IVANOVA Dina
3rd prize — BERNALDO DE QUIRÓS Antonio
23rd Competition, 2018
1st Prize — Nikolai KUZNETSOV
2nd Prize — Dmytro CHONI
3rd Prize — Anna DMYTRENKO

External links 
 Official website of the Competition

References 

Piano competitions
Music competitions in Spain